Cooper County is located in the central portion of the U.S. state of Missouri. As of the 2020 United States census, the population was 17,103. Its county seat is Boonville. The county was organized December 17, 1818 and named for Sarshell Cooper, a frontier settler who was killed by Native Americans near Arrow Rock in 1814. It is a part of the Columbia, Missouri metropolitan area.

Geography

Adjacent counties
Howard County (north)
Boone County (northeast)
Moniteau County (southeast)
Morgan County (south)
Pettis County (west)
Saline County (northwest)

Major highways

  Interstate 70
  U.S. Route 40
  Route 5
  Route 41
  Route 87
  Route 98
  Route 135
  Route 179

National protected area
Big Muddy National Fish and Wildlife Refuge

Demographics

As of the 2000 census, there were 16,670 people, 5,932 households and 4,140 families residing in the county. The population density was 30 per square mile (11/km2). There were 6,676 housing units at an average density of 12 per square mile (5/km2). The racial makeup of the county was 89.05% White, 8.96% Black or African American, 0.36% Native American, 0.23% Asian, 0.02% Pacific Islander, 0.28% from other races, and 1.11% from two or more races. Approximately 0.86% of the population were Hispanic or Latino of any race. 38.1% were of German, 18.7% American, 8.1% English and 8.0% Irish ancestry.

There were 5,932 households, of which 31.80% had children under the age of 18 living with them, 57.40% were married couples living together, 9.00% had a female householder with no husband present, and 30.20% were non-families. 26.10% of all households were made up of individuals, and 12.60% had someone living alone who was 65 years of age or older. The average household size was 2.46 and the average family size was 2.97.

Age distribution was 22.80% under the age of 18, 14.00% from 18 to 24, 27.40% from 25 to 44, 20.60% from 45 to 64, and 15.20% who were 65 years of age or older.  The median age was 35 years. For every 100 females, there were 117.40 males.  For every 100 females age 18 and over, there were 120.00 males.

The median household income was $35,313, and the median family income was $41,526. Males had a median income of $28,513 versus $20,965 for females. The per capita income for the county was $15,648.  About 8.30% of families and 10.70% of the population were below the poverty line, including 12.80% of those under age 18 and 8.30% of those age 65 or over.

2020 Census

Education

Public schools
Blackwater R-II School District  – Blackwater
Blackwater Elementary School (PK-08)
Boonville R-I School District – Boonville
Hannah Cole Primary School (PK-02)
David Barton Elementary School (03-05)
Laura Speed Elliott Middle School (06-08)
Boonville High School (09-12)
Cooper County R-IV School District – Bunceton
Bunceton Elementary School (K-06)
Bunceton High School (07-12)
Otterville R-VI School District – Otterville
Otterville Elementary School (K-06)
Otterville High School (07-12)
Pilot Grove C-4 School District – Pilot Grove
Pilot Grove Elementary School (PK-05)
Pilot Grove Middle School (06-08)
Pilot Grove High School (09-12)
Prairie Home R-V School District – Prairie Home
Prairie Home Elementary School (K-06)
Prairie Home High School (07-12)

Private schools
Saints Peter & Paul School – Boonville (K-09) – Roman Catholic
Zion Lutheran School – Bunceton (02-08) – Lutheran
St. Joseph Elementary School – Pilot Grove (02-09) – Roman Catholic

Public libraries
Boonville/Cooper Branch Library

Politics

Local
The Republican Party completely controls politics at the local level in Cooper County. Republicans hold all of the elected positions in the county.

State

Cooper County is divided into three legislative districts in the Missouri House of Representatives, all of which elected Republicans, but one is currently vacant.
District 47 — Chuck Basye (R-Rocheport). Consists of areas east of the city of Boonville.

District 48 — Tim Taylor (politician) (R-Bunceton). Consists of the communities of Blackwater, Boonville, Bunceton, Otterville, and Pilot Grove.

District 50 — Sara Walsh. (R-Ashland). Consists of the community of Prairie Home and much of the rest of the eastern portion of the county.

 

All of Cooper County is a part of Missouri's 19th District in the Missouri Senate and is currently represented by Caleb Rowden (R-Columbia).

Federal

All of Cooper County is included in Missouri's 4th Congressional District and is currently represented by Vicky Hartzler (R-Harrisonville) in the U.S. House of Representatives.

Communities

Cities
Blackwater
Boonville (county seat)
Bunceton
Otterville
Pilot Grove
Prairie Home

Villages
Windsor Place
Wooldridge

Unincorporated communities

 Bellair
 Billingsville
 Chouteau Springs
 Clarks Fork
 Clifton City
 Harriston
 Lamine
 Lone Elm
 New Lebanon
 Overton
 Pisgah
 Pleasant Green
 Speed

Townships
Cooper County is divided into 14 townships:

 Blackwater
 Boonville
 Clark Fork
 Clear Creek
 Kelly
 Lamine
 Lebanon
 North Moniteau
 Otterville
 Palestine
 Pilot Grove
 Prairie Home
 Saline
 South Moniteau

Notable person
Country music singer Sara Evans was born in Cooper County.

See also
National Register of Historic Places listings in Cooper County, Missouri

References

External links
 Cooper County Information from MO-River.Net
 Digitized 1930 Plat Book of Cooper County  from University of Missouri Division of Special Collections, Archives, and Rare Books
 Cooper County Sheriff's Office

 
1818 establishments in Missouri Territory
Populated places established in 1818
Missouri counties on the Missouri River
Columbia metropolitan area (Missouri)